What? And Give Up Show Biz? is a live double album by Austin, Texas-based band Asylum Street Spankers, which documents the band's performance of a revue of the same name at Barrow Street Theatre during a two-week period in January 2008. The album was released on September 30, 2008 on Yellow Dog Records in the United States. In his review of the revue, David Sprague of Variety wrote: "The book, built on fleshed-out codifications of the members’ road-tested stage banter, is somewhat slight, but the ratio of knee-slappers to groan-inducers is high enough to make it diverting." In the same review, he concluded, "...given the Spankers’ remarkably deft musicianship and bottomless pit of material — bad breaks and bad brakes are both likely to be part of the touring band vernacular for some time to come — the revue would seem to have legs."

Track listing

Disc 1
 "Ladies and Gentlemen... I've Wasted My Life"
 Everybody Loves My Baby
 "Nice Theater"
 "My Country's Calling Me"
 Winning the War on Drugs
 Blue Prelude
 "It's good to be here in, uh...."
 Why Do It Right?
 "Stanley and Wammo"
 Since I Met You Baby
 "Gig from Hell"
 Monkey Rag
 "The Morning Moron Mob"
 Medley of Burned Out Songs
 Beer
 "Strange Talents"
 Leaf Blower
 "The Bus Story"
 Think About Your Troubles
 "Daddy Drinks Because You Cry"
 You Only Love Me For My Lunchbox

Disc 2
 "Y'all like love songs?"
 My Baby in the CIA
 "Read thinner books."
 Asylum Street Blues
 Breathin'
 "bathroom break"
 Big Noise From Winnetka
 Hick Hop
 Got My Mojo Workin'
 "take a good look..."
 My Favorite Record
 "Encore!"
 Blade of Grass
 "Requests?"
 Pakalolo Baby
 Tight Like That
 Wake and Bake
 TV Party
 "goodnight"
 Stick Magnetic Ribbons on Your SUV

Personnel 
Asylum Street Spankers –	primary artist
Brooke Barnett –	graphic design
Justin Fox Burks –	photography
Joshua Cain –	stage manager
Tom Durack –	mastering
Josh Hoag –	bass
Patrick Jacobs –	audio engineer
Charlie King –	dobro, harmonica, mandolin, member of attributed artist, throat singing, vocals
Rich Lamb –	engineer, mixing
Scott Marcus –	drums, percussion, vocals
Christina Marrs –	audio production, executive producer, guitars, musical saw, producer, tenor banjo, ukulele, vocals
Nevada Newman –	guitar, mandolin, vocals
J.P. Riedie –	audio production, director, producer
Korey Simeone –	member of attributed artist, violin, vocals
Stanley Smith –	clarinet, guitar, member of attributed artist, vocals
Wammo –	audio production, executive producer, harmonica, percussion, producer, vocals, washboard, whistle
Todd Sebastian Williams –	cover photo, photography

References

2008 live albums
Asylum Street Spankers albums
Yellow Dog Records albums